Clay County Schools (CCS) is the school district in North Carolina, that manages the county's public school system. It is the only school system in Clay County, with about 1,200 students attending a total of 3 separate schools, located on a central campus in Hayesville, North Carolina. The system covers all of Clay County.

The district is run by the Clay County School's superintendent. The current superintendent is Mark Leek.

Because of its county-wide coverage, there are some students in the system that have an hour-long bus-ride to and from school.

Schools
Hayesville elementary, middle and high schools are all located in a central campus in Hayesville, North Carolina. There are no separate busses for grade levels, and all students are dropped off at the same time. The schools' colours are Black and Yellow, and their mascot is the Yellow Jacket.

Elementary
Hayesville Elementary covers Pre-K thru 4th grade and has an enrollment of approximately 625 students.

Middle
Hayesville Middle covers 5th thru 8th and has an active enrollment of around 450 Students

High
Hayesville High covers 9th grade thru 12th grade and has an enrollment of nearly 400 students. It is accredited by the Southern Association of Colleges and Schools.

Test scores
According to the Clay County School System's Website, "Test Scores are consistently in the top 10% of all schools in North Carolina." Every year, since the inception of NC's ABC program, Hayesville Elementary has been rated exemplary and Hayesville Middle School has been classified as a School of Distinction or Excellence. Hayesville High School has had the best SAT scores of any school in the area.

References

External links

School districts in North Carolina
Education in Clay County, North Carolina